{{DISPLAYTITLE:C27H48}}
The molecular formula C27H48 (molar mass: 372.67 g/mol, exact mass: 372.3756 u) may refer to:

 Cholestane
 Coprostane, or 5β-cholestane
 1,3,5-Triheptylbenzene, also called sym-triheptylbenzene